Theriot is an unincorporated community in Lafourche Parish, Louisiana, United States.

Notes

Unincorporated communities in Lafourche Parish, Louisiana
Unincorporated communities in Louisiana
Unincorporated communities in Houma – Thibodaux metropolitan area